Get It How U Live!! is the debut album by New Orleans hip-hop group the Hot Boys, released on October 28, 1997, on Ca$h Money. The album sold over 400,000 copies, primarily in New Orleans following B.G.'s success. It peaked at No. 37 on the Billboard Top R&B Albums chart in 1997. All tracks featured on the album were produced by Mannie Fresh.

Track listing 

Samples credits
"I'm A Hot Boy" contains a sample of "Welcome 2 Tha Section" performed by Juvenile and features B.G., Mannie Fresh & Bullet Proof.

All tracks are produced by Mannie Fresh

References

1997 debut albums
Hot Boys albums
Cash Money Records albums
Albums produced by Mannie Fresh